Louisiana Highway 112 (LA 112) is a state highway in Louisiana. It spans  and runs from west to east. The western terminus is at an intersection with U.S. Route 171/U.S. Route 190 in Beauregard Parish and the eastern terminus at an intersection with US 167/US 71 in Rapides Parish. Although the highway runs west to east it meanders through three parishes and on the map appears to make a large S.

Route description
Beginning at the western terminus LA 112 travels northeast and intersects with LA 113 in Sugartown, enters Allen Parish, and merges running concurrent a short distance with LA 377. LA 113  then intersects with LA 1156, and into Elizabeth, intersecting and running concurrent with LA 10 east a short distance. LA 10 splits continuing east while LA 112 turns north, enters Rapides Parish, merges with LA 113 again at Union Hill. LA 112 swings northwest then north and merges running concurrent with LA 121, intersecting LA 461, and splitting in Hineston. LA 121 continues north to intersect with LA 28 and LA 112 resumes an eastern route, passing through the community of Lisso, intersecting LA 488 then LA 1199, and passes through the communities of Elmer and Melder before intersecting and merging with U.S. 165 south into Forest Hill. LA 112 swings east then northeast, like a large check mark, before resuming an eastern route, passing through the community of Midway, and intersecting Interstate 49, before terminating in Lecompte at an intersection with U.S. 167/ U.S. 71.

Major intersections

References

External links

Louisiana State Highway Log
LADOTD Map of Numbered Highways in Louisiana

0112
Transportation in Beauregard Parish, Louisiana
Transportation in Allen Parish, Louisiana
Transportation in Rapides Parish, Louisiana